Figeac is a commune in the Lot department in south-western France.  Figeac is a sub-prefecture of the department.

Geography
Figeac is on the via Podiensis, a major hiking medieval pilgrimage trail which is part of the Way of St. James. Today, as a part of France's system of trails it is labelled the GR 65. Figeac station is a railway junction with connections to Brive-la-Gaillarde, Toulouse, Aurillac and Rodez.

Population

Notable people
Jean-François Champollion, the first translator of Egyptian hieroglyphics, was born in Figeac, where there is a Champollion Museum. His father had married a woman from Figeac and opened a bookshop in the village. On the "Place des écritures" (writings place) is a giant copy of the Rosetta stone, by Joseph Kosuth. French explorer and archeologist Théodore Ber was born in Figeac, although he spent most of his adult life in Peru. German film historian Lotte H Eisner hid from the Nazis in Figeac during World War II.

Actor Charles Boyer and football player Vincent Beduer were also born in Figeac.

Economy 
This city hosts the headquarters of Figeac Aero.

Media
Louis Malle's 1974 film, Lacombe Lucien, was filmed in Figeac.

See also
Communes of the Lot department

References

External links

Figeac website
Tourist office
Picture of the Place des Ecritures
Explore the local area

Communes of Lot (department)
Subprefectures in France
World Heritage Sites in France
Quercy